QOR may refer to:

 The Queen's Own Rifles of Canada, a Canadian Forces airborne infantry regiment based in Toronto, Ontario
 Quality of results, a term used in evaluating technological processes
 QoR Watercolors by Golden Artist Colors, a "Quality of Results" line of modern watercolor paints.
 Quality of Resilience (QoR), an electrical engineering term
 qor gene, a gene in human DNA
 Kor (Star Trek), character in the Star Trek universe
 Qor, a school of dark magic in the game Meridian 59